The Dimension Riders is an original novel written by Daniel Blythe and based on the long-running British science fiction television series Doctor Who. It features the Seventh Doctor, Ace and Bernice. A prelude to the novel, also penned by Blythe, appeared in Doctor Who Magazine #206. This novel is the second novel in the "Alternate Universe cycle" which continues until No Future.

External links
The Dimension Riders Prelude

1993 British novels
1993 science fiction novels
Virgin New Adventures
Seventh Doctor novels